Sedeh District is a district (bakhsh) in Qaen County, South Khorasan Province, Iran. At the 2006 census, its population was 18,792, in 5,155 families.  The District has one city: Arianshahr.  The District has three rural districts (dehestan): Afriz Rural District, Paskuh Rural District, and Sedeh Rural District.

References 

Districts of South Khorasan Province
Qaen County